Egloos is a South Korean blog host, established in 2003. Its current owner,  SK Communications, claims it to be a professional publishing system. The ISP acquired the service in 2006. The site is reported to have around 1 million users, but lost users to foreign blogging sites in 2009 due to concerns regarding the South Korean government's monitoring of its citizens: "Since April 1 (2009), the government mandated Internet users to make verifiable real-name registrations on all Web sites with more than 100,000 daily visitors, which means they have to submit their resident registration codes, the Korean equivalent of social security numbers" web-browsing behavior.

The name "Egloo" is derived from the word "igloo" and represents a personal online home for its users' lives.

Users
Egloos' users are often Koreans with an intensive interest in IT-related interests, with anime and manga featured throughout (known as otaku in Japan).

Valley system
Egloos uses a unique, theme-based system called "valley", whereby bloggers can choose to adopt and publish their blog postings under pre-existing themes (valleys). Valleys can also be created by user demand. As of 2012, Egloos hosts 29 valleys.
 Book Valley 
 Animation Valley 
 News criticism 
 Egloos Valley
 Movie Valley 
 History Valley
 World Valley
 Comic Valley

Censorship
The Blog allowed censorship of the posting  censored by the site administrator under certain circumstances. However, Egloos users have complained about the fairness of the censoring process, as site administrators have been able to censor content based upon a request from anyone reading the blogs.

References

External links
Official Website

Blog hosting services